Emil Hasler (8 November 1901 – 15 January 1986) was a German art director who worked on more than a hundred films during his career. These included a number of Weimar classics such as Diary of a Lost Girl, M and The Blue Angel. He later worked in Nazi era cinema on films like Robert Koch and Münchhausen.

Selected filmography

 Monika Vogelsang (1920)
 Always Be True and Faithful (1927)
 Dyckerpotts' Heirs (1928)
 Odette (1928)
 Diary of a Lost Girl (1929)
 The Fourth from the Right (1929)
 Three Days Confined to Barracks (1930)
 The Blue Angel (1930)
 Twice Married (1930)
 Shadows of the Underworld (1931)
 M (1931)
 Hooray, It's a Boy! (1931)
 What Women Dream (1933)
 The Castle in the South (1933)
 Dream Castle (1933)
 Spring Parade (1934)
 Farewell Waltz (1934)
 Winter Night's Dream (1935)
 A Night on the Danube (1935)
 Pygmalion (1935)
 Stradivari (1935)
 Stradivarius (1935)
 The Empress's Favourite  (1936)
 The Castle in Flanders (1936)
 The Cabbie's Song (1936)
 The Last Waltz (1936)
 Premiere (1937)
 The Irresistible Man (1937)
 The Woman at the Crossroads (1938)
 Napoleon Is to Blame for Everything (1938)
 Robert Koch (1939)
 The Three Codonas (1940)
 Münchhausen (1943)
 Nora (1944)
 Chemistry and Love (1948)
 Nights on the Nile (1949)
 A Rare Lover (1950)
 Not Without Gisela (1951)
 The Chaste Libertine (1952)
 The Colourful Dream (1952)
 The Prince of Pappenheim (1952)
 The Dancing Heart (1953)
 The Stronger Woman (1953)
 A Life for Do (1954)
 The Witch (1954)
 Before God and Man (1955)
 Heaven Is Never Booked Up (1955)
 The Beautiful Master (1956)
 Precocious Youth (1957)
 The Count of Luxemburg (1957)
 The Simple Girl (1957)
 Just Once a Great Lady (1957)
 Voyage to Italy, Complete with Love (1958)
 Munchhausen in Africa (1958)
 The Death Ship (1959)
 What a Woman Dreams of in Springtime (1959)
 The Red Hand (1960)
 Her Most Beautiful Day (1962)

References

Bibliography
 Prawer, S.S. Between Two Worlds: The Jewish Presence in German and Austrian Film, 1910-1933. Berghahn Books, 2005.

External links

1901 births
1986 deaths
German art directors
Film people from Berlin